Hands on Me may refer to:

 Hands on Me (EP) a 2017 EP by Kim Chung-ha

 "Hands on Me" (Vanessa Carlton song), 2007
 "Hands on Me", a song by Bobby V from the album The Rebirth, 2009
 "Hands on Me", a song by Ariana Grande from the album My Everything, 2014
 "Hands on Me", a 2018 song by Burns